Christine Adams (born 14 August 1974) is a British actress. She is best known for playing Jessica in Batman Begins (2005), Lena Boudreaux in The Whole Truth (2010–2011), and as Lynn Pierce in Black Lightning (2018–2021).

Early life
Adams was born in Brentwood, Essex and grew up in Northampton. She studied at Middlesex University.

Career
Adams began her acting career starring in the mini-series NY-LON in 2004. She later guest-starred on many television series such as My Family, Doctor Who, Pushing Daisies, Heroes and Nip/Tuck and Real Husbands of Hollywood with Kevin Hart. Her film credits include Submerged, Batman Begins, Eye of the Dolphin, Green Flash, Beneath the Blue, and Tron: Legacy. Adams starred on the short-lived ABC series The Whole Truth as Lena Boudreaux in 2010, and FOX's Terra Nova as Mira, the leader of the "Sixers", a rebel group that arrived with the Sixth Pilgrimage but who soon broke away to oppose Terra Nova.

In 2012, Adams co-starred on the unsuccessful ABC drama pilot Americana as Anthony LaPaglia's wife Sierra, a bronze-skinned East African beauty and former supermodel. She later had a recurring role on Agents of S.H.I.E.L.D. as Agent Anne Weaver, and in 2016 starred in the short-lived AMC drama Feed the Beast opposite David Schwimmer.

In 2017, Adams was cast to be in The CW superhero television drama series Black Lightning created by Mara Brock Akil playing Lynn Pierce, Black Lightning's ex-wife.

Personal life
Adams currently resides in Atlanta, Georgia with her husband and daughters. On 16 October 2019, she became a naturalized U.S. Citizen.

Filmography

Film

Television

References

External links
 

Living people
1974 births
20th-century English actresses
21st-century English actresses
Alumni of Middlesex University
Actors from Northamptonshire
Actresses from Essex
Actresses from London
Black British actresses
British expatriate actresses in the United States
English expatriates in the United States
English people of Jamaican descent
English film actresses
English television actresses
English voice actresses
Naturalized citizens of the United States
People from Brentwood, Essex
People from Northampton